.er is the country code top-level domain (ccTLD) for Eritrea.

2nd level domains

A number of second level domains exist; however, there is no information available about their exact purposes (although inferences can be made) or restrictions.

 com.er, likely for commercial entities/businesses
 edu.er, likely for educational institutions
 gov.er, reserved for the Eritrean government
 mil.er, reserved for the Eritrean military; empty zone (unchanged since August 2004)
 net.er, likely for network operators/providers
 org.er, likely for nonprofit organisations
 ind.er, likely for Eritrean individuals; empty zone (unchanged since August 2004)

References

External links
IANA .er whois information
Top-Level-Domain .ER: Information about the ccTLD 

Country code top-level domains
Communications in Eritrea